Tommy Allen Patton (born September 5, 1935) is an American former professional baseball player whose career extended from  through .

Patton played a single game in Major League Baseball, for the 1957 Baltimore Orioles. On April 30, at Comiskey Park in Chicago, Patton relieved starting catcher Joe Ginsberg as part of a double switch. He went hitless in two at bats against the White Sox' Billy Pierce and played errorless ball in the field, handling six chances.

He had been drafted from his original organization, the St. Louis Cardinals, after the  season.  After his one-game stint, the Orioles sent Patton to their Texas League Double-A farm club, the San Antonio Missions, and he played the remainder of his professional career in minor league baseball in the Orioles' and Philadelphia Phillies' organizations. He batted .261 in 2,033 minor league at bats.

References

External links

1935 births
Living people
Amarillo Gold Sox players
Baltimore Orioles players
Baseball players from Pennsylvania
Columbus Cardinals players
Houston Buffaloes players
Indianapolis Indians players
Little Rock Travelers players
Major League Baseball catchers
People from Honey Brook, Pennsylvania
Peoria Chiefs players
San Antonio Missions players
Vancouver Mounties players
Williamsport Grays players